Samiylo Kishka (approximately 1530 – 1602(1620)) was a nobleman from Bratslav. He was a kish otaman and Hetman of Zaporozhian Sich (1574 — 1575, 1599 — 1602). Samiylo Kishka headed the Cossack army in a range of sea campaigns against the Turks, Moldavian raids, the Livonian campaign (1600-1603), as well as a number of maritime campaigns against the Crimean Khanate: Gezlev, Izmail, Ochakiv, and Ackerman.

Biography

Early life 
Samiylo Kishka was born in 1530 into a family of noblemen from Bratslav. At the age of twenty, he began to live as a Cossack. During the first years of being an active Cossack, he took part in several campaigns headed by Dmytro Vyshnevetsky, a Hetman of the Zaporozhian Cossacks, who is considered the founder of the first Zaporozhian Sich in Khortytsia. Being an ordinary Cossack, he confronted Tatar attacks on the Ukrainian lands.

Hetman of Zaporozhian Sich 

Hetman Samiylo Kishka is famous for leading the Cossacks in successful naval expeditions against the Turks. In the late 1560s, he began leading sea campaigns against the Turks. Cossack campaigns brought much concern to the Ottoman Empire, so the Ottoman sultan Selim II decided to use diplomatic and military means to influence Rzeczpospolita King Sigismund II Augustus. The King attempted to terminate the Cossacks' sea campaigns, but that tactic failed.

In 1573 Samiylo Kishka was defeated by the dominant Ottoman forces. He was taken prisoner and chained in a Turkish galley. He spent 25 years there until he escaped in 1599. His escape was the result of a slave's armed uprising. Afterward, he was elected Hetman for several more years.

In 1599 Samiylo Kishka helped the Polish king in a war with the Walachians in Moldavia, where he organized land raids.

In 1600 Samiylo Kishka started negotiations with King Sigismund III Vaza and managed to reach Poland's recognition of the Cossacks as a social status. Additionally, the King supported a campaign against the Crimean Khanate.

Later in 1600, the Polish king received help from the Cossacks in Polish–Swedish War (1600–1629). Kiska took 2,000-4,000 Zaporozhian Cossacks that fought on the Polish side for several years. Kishka aimed to repeal anti-Cossack legislation. Additionally, certain payments for participation in military campaigns, in addition to maintenance costs, were agreed upon.

In 1602, during that campaign, Samiylo Kishka died in the Siege of Fellin (present-day Viljandi in Estonia). The Cossacks elected another commander and continued to fight, though they ceased being paid by the Polish regime. Consequently, they resorted to looting local towns and villages for sustenance and other needs.

In art 
There are some historical songs and Dumas with moral and patriotic ideological subtext that are dedicated to Samiylo Kishka.

Borys Yanovsky wrote the epic opera A Song Of The Black Sea about Hetman Samiylo Kishka and his Zaporogian Cossacks in Turkish captivity.

See also 

 Zaporozhian Host
 Kish otaman

References 

1530 births
1602 deaths
Hetmans of the Zaporozhian Cossacks
Ruthenian nobility of the Polish–Lithuanian Commonwealth
Zaporozhian Cossack nobility
Eastern Orthodox Christians from Ukraine
Kosh Otamans